Hip Hop Harry is an American children's television series that aired on Discovery Kids and TLC as part of the Ready Set Learn block from 2006 to 2008. Similar to PBS Kids series such as Barney & Friends (the setting of the show bears resemblance to Barney in nature), Teletubbies and The Wiggles, Hip Hop Harry is a live-action program aimed at younger children ranging from around 2–7 years old. The program uses age-appropriate hip hop music and dance to teach social, educational, physical and creative skills.

Synopsis
The show takes place in a learning/play center house known as "Hip Hop Central", where Hip Hop Harry and his kids learn, play and dance. In between, the kids learn about the main topic of the episode. After they have learned about the topic, they sing and rap the song "I Love to Learn." Then, the kids and Hip Hop discuss what they've learned via questions/answers and watching recaps from the day's episode via a push-button monitor. Each episode ends with the "Hip Hop Harry Dance Circle", where the kids circle up while one of them dances in the center as they shout, "Go! Go! Go! Go! Go!", to an instrumental hip hop track, with Arabian-tinged music. Even Harry dances in the circle too (thus, the kids shout, "Go, Harry!!"). But before they dance, they do a warm-up dance called, "The Harry". After the kids come together to move in the middle, the credits roll.

Physical appearance
Hip Hop Harry is an anthropomorphic rapping yellow furry bear with a red shirt, blue hat, baggy blue jeans, a gold chain with an "H" in the middle and white sneaker shoes with an "H" on each side. He also wears a blue and red wristwatch. The character's appearance is in the general style of hip-hop fashion. His birthday is January 22nd, as noted in Episode 5.

Cast
 Ali Alimi - Voice of Hip Hop Harry 
 David Joyner - Hip Hop Harry (In-suit performer), Chef Rob (1 episode)
 Ben Blair - Hip Hop Harry (In-suit performer) (2 episodes),  Dr. Vinnie (1 episode)
 Kefla Hare - Hip Hop Harry (In-suit performer) (5 episodes)

People
 Ryan Andres - Told jokes in the episode "Finding Your Talent".
 Kelli Berglund - Kelli helped plan a surprise party for Pinky in "Do Your Part."
 Kendra Bracy - Kendra introduced her grandmother from Trinidad in one episode.
 Colton Burton - Colton was one of William's best friends in real life and refused to count the pilots, he did not appear in an episode of Hip Hop Harry without him.
 Kiana Contreras - Kiana played a supporting role in the episode "Get Involved," cheering her sister's Double Dutch team to victory.
 Jake Deanda - Jake was one of the main kids to meet Katie in "Making New Friends."
 Savannah DeJesus - Savannah appeared in "Fancy Footwook" and "Rain Makes Rainbows" with her sister Sophina.
 Sophina DeJesus - Sophina was an aspiring gymnast who enjoys working with her sister, Savannah.
 Kelly Dolan - played Pinky.
 Jeremy Washington - played Riddles.
 Hayden Harrah - Hayden appeared less frequently than other members of the cast, but was a big help during "A B See".
 Jay Jay Harris - Jay Jay is shown in "Pajama Party" and "Just Give it a Try" to be resistant to try new things. He and Riddles got along very well. After a good bongo drum performance, Hip Hop Harry commented that Jay Jay may one day be on a salsa record.
 William May -  He appears in several episodes.  In "Hip Hop Big Top" he was concerned about being unable to dance with a brace on his leg. With encouragement from Hip Hop Harry and his friends, he realized he could still be a part of the circus.
 Veronicaa Miller - Veronicaa was shown to discover a talent for singing in "Finding Your Talent."
 Katie Petitte - The new girl in "Making New Friends." She takes a hip hop dance class near the end of the series.
 Davide Schiavone - Dancer 
 Elizabeth Small - Her zipper served the finishing touch in "A B See."
 Scott Thomas - Scott appears in several episodes. He was featured in "Never Give Up", when he wanted to quit basketball due to a bad day at practice.  Hip Hop Harry gave him some encouragement and Scott realized that he should never give up.
 Megan Woo - Megan loved animals and wishes to be a veterinarian when she grows up.
 Tyler White - A young breakdancer with a talent for windmills and the strongman in Hip Hop Harry's circus.
 Mail Carrier Carla - played by Valerie Sheppard, who appears in the episode, "Dream It! Achieve It!"

Events
The cast performed their song Move Those Feet at the Los Angeles Times Festival of Books on April 25-26, 2009 on the Target children's stage on the campus of UCLA.

Episodes

Season 1 (2006)

Season 2 (2007–08)

Broadcast and home media
Hip Hop Harry has been recently aired on Discovery Kids and TLC (as part of the "Ready Set Learn" block), as well as most Retro TV affiliates. As of 2023, the show is now streaming on Tubi.

Legacy
In 2017, the character Harry was featured in the YouTube web series Hip Hop Harry Toy Review.

In 2020, Hip Hop Harry had a resurgence in popularity on social media soon after people began to protest following the murder of George Floyd. Clips of the "Hip Hop Harry Dance Circle" portion of the show first resurfaced on Twitter when director and author Matthew A. Cherry posted a short video of this sequence in response to reports that all four of the officers involved in the death had been arrested. The video went viral and many across social media continued to post several dancing clips from the show in celebration of victories in the fight for police reform and racial equality.

Reception
Common Sense Media rated the show a four out of five stars.

References

 
 Hip Hop Harry Season 1-1 Episode Guide
 

2006 American television series debuts
2008 American television series endings
Hip hop television
2000s American children's television series
2000s American music television series
TLC (TV network) original programming
Television series about bears
American television shows featuring puppetry
American children's musical television series
Television series about children
American preschool education television series
2000s preschool education television series
Discovery Kids original programming